The following is a list of the European Film Award winners and nominees for Special Aspect Award or for Prix d'Excellence Award. This category contains different aspects of cinematography works which were not mentioned in other categories during the ceremony show.

Winners and nominees

External links
 Nominees and winners at the European Film Academy website

Prix d'Excellence
Awards disestablished in 2009
Awards established in 1988